The Daily Nonpareil is a daily newspaper serving Council Bluffs and a 10-county area of southwest Iowa.

The Daily Nonpareil is southwest Iowa's largest newspaper. It was founded on May 2, 1857.

The paper was acquired in 2011 by Berkshire Hathaway, when it bought the paper's then parent, the Omaha World-Herald and its other subsidiary newspapers in Kearney, Grand Island, York, North Platte, and Scottsbluff, Nebraska.  The World-Herald acquired partial ownership in 2000 and full ownership in 2007.

In 2020, Lee Enterprises purchased BH Media Group's newspapers. This purchase included The Daily Nonpareil, the Clarinda Herald-Journal, the Shenandoah Valley News Today, the Logan-Woodbine Twiner, and the Denison Bulletin-Review. On March 16, 2020, Lee officially took over as The Daily Nonpareil's parent company.
 
Unusually, the paper made a dual-party endorsement in 2016, endorsing both Bernie Sanders and John Kasich, as the best-qualified nominees of the two major parties.

From 1965 to 2000, it was owned by several newspaper chains, including Thomson Newspapers and MediaNews Group.

References

External links
 
 

1857 establishments in Iowa
Council Bluffs, Iowa
Daily newspapers published in the United States
Lee Enterprises publications
Newspapers published in Iowa
Publications established in 1857